Matteo Agosta (18 January 1922 – 18 May 1964) was an Italian politician.

Had a degree in law and philosophy; lawyer.

Agosta was born in Vizzini.  He represented the Christian Democracy party in the Chamber of Deputies from 1958 to 1964.

References

1922 births
1964 deaths
People from Vizzini
Christian Democracy (Italy) politicians
Deputies of Legislature III of Italy
Politicians from the Province of Catania